Carracedelo is a village and municipality located in the region of El Bierzo (province of León, Castile and León, Spain) . According to the 2010 census (INE), the municipality has a population of 3,658 inhabitants. The semirestored ruins of the Monastery of Saint Mary of Carracedo are nearby.

The populated places of this municipality include Carracedo proper, Carracedo del Monasterio, Posada del Bierzo, Villadepalos, Villamartín de la Abadía and Villaverde de la Abadía.

It's one of the towns of El Bierzo where the population also speaks Galician, but this language is extinguishing because the Junta of Castilla y León does not preserve the Galician culture in this zone, for these reason they do not teach Galician in the schools, it's just an optional subject in the syllabus.

References

Municipalities in El Bierzo